Hate (also threat,  aggro, or enmity) is a mechanism used in many MMORPGs, as well as in some RPGs, by which mobs (enemies controlled by the system) prioritize which characters to attack. The player who generates the most hate on a mob will be preferentially attacked by that mob. The act of initiating such situation is called "getting aggro" or "pulling aggro."

The character with the highest amount of hate relative to his allies has aggro. The threat list or threat table is the ordering of players by the amount of hate they have generated. Some mobs have fight mechanics that will ignore hate completely, change which player has aggro despite hate, or periodically reset the threat list, resetting all hate to 0.

Tanks
For most characters, hate is an undesirable side effect of their attack on an enemy. However, a type of character called a tank deliberately pulls aggro towards themself, and away from other player characters.

To do this, the tank is typically the first to attack an enemy, and may have powers or skills designed to draw the enemy's attention. The tank has a high amount of defense and health to survive constant attacks of mobs.

Hate calculation

A game may calculate hate generated by a player on a mob based using factors such as:
 Whether the mob is set to attack players on sight (aggressive).
 The distance between the mob and the player. The area in which a player automatically gets hate or aggro is called the Aggro Radius.
 The relative strength of the player compared to the mob.
 How much damage has been dealt to the mob by the player.
 Debuffs and status effects inflicted on the mob by the player.
 Heals and buffs given by the player to other players or NPCs (such as pets) who are attacking the mob.
 Status effects on the player, such as invincibility, sleep, and death, which make them more or less favorable to attack.
 Hate generating or reducing abilities (such as taunts or invisibility) used by the player.
 Time elapsed since the player last generated hate on the NPC.

Hate can also be manipulated to deter a mob from attacking. A player may use a hate-reducing ability, ask another player to generate more hate than themself, run away or move to a distant position, or stop generating hate and wait for the mob to attack someone else. In many games, a player who is defeated or killed has the hate mobs have on them reduced to zero.

References

Video game terminology